The team competition of the Open water swimming events at the 2013 World Aquatics Championships was held on 25 July 2013.

Results
The race was started at 12:00.

References

Team
World Aquatics Championships